William Henry Draper (June 24, 1841 – December 7, 1921) was a Republican member of the United States House of Representatives from New York.

Early life
Born in Rochdale, Massachusetts in 1841, Draper moved with his family to Troy, New York in 1847. He was the president of W.H. Draper & Sons which manufactured cord and twine.

Political career
Draper was elected as a Republican to the Fifty-seventh Congress as the representative of New York's 19th congressional district serving from March 4, 1901, to March 3, 1903. For the Fifty-eighth Congress he redistricted and was elected as the representative of New York's 22nd congressional district; he was reelected to the succeeding four congresses serving from March 4, 1903, to March 3, 1913. He chose not to run for reelection to the Sixty-third Congress, and was succeeded by Henry Bruckner.

Later life
He died in Troy, New York on December 7, 1921. He was interred in Oakwood Cemetery.

References 
 

1841 births
1921 deaths
People from Leicester, Massachusetts
Politicians from Troy, New York
Republican Party members of the United States House of Representatives from New York (state)
Burials at Oakwood Cemetery (Troy, New York)